Liv Hewson (born 29 November 1995) is an Australian actor and playwright. Their written work includes "lots of re-imaginings of fairytales and mythology with a queer and dark slant." They starred as Abby Hammond in the Netflix series Santa Clarita Diet from 2017 to 2019.

Career
In 2014, Hewson traveled to Los Angeles to attend an acting workshop. In 2016, they played the lead role of Claire Duncan in the fantasy web series Dramaworld. In 2017, they starred in the film Before I Fall and had recurring roles in the second series of Top of the Lake and in the miniseries Marvel's Inhumans.

Personal life
Hewson was born in Canberra, grew up in the suburb of Hughes and attended Alfred Deakin High School and Canberra College. Hewson has three brothers; their mother, Angela, is a public servant and their father, Tony, is a psychologist. Hewson began acting as part of the Canberra Youth Theatre. Growing up, the family watched a lot of American television shows, such as The Simpsons and Futurama, which Hewson said made it easy to act with an American accent.

Hewson came out as non-binary at age 16. They are gay and use they/them pronouns. In 2020, Hewson received the Human Rights Campaign Visibility Award for their LGBT+ advocacy.

Filmography

Film

Television

Web series

References

External links
 
 

1995 births
Living people
Actors from Canberra
Australian stage actors
Australian television actors
Australian dramatists and playwrights
21st-century Australian actors
Non-binary writers
Australian LGBT actors
Australian LGBT dramatists and playwrights
Australian non-binary actors